Derbyshire Cricket Board played in List A cricket matches between 1999 and 2002. This is a list of the players who appeared in those matches.

Kamran Afzaal (1999): K Afzaal
Kaisar Altaf (2001): K Altaf
William Bagshawe (2001): WJL Bagshawe
Jamie Benstead (2000–2002): JR Benstead
Peter Camm (1999–2001): P Camm
Ian Darlington (1999–2002): IJ Darlington
Peter Davies (2000): PGT Davies
Carl Doar (2001): CM Doar
David Dodds (2000–2001): DH Dodds
Nathan Dumelow (1999–2000): NRC Dumelow
James Ede (2002): JL Ede
Carl Eyden (2001): CD Eyden
Alan Gofton (2000): AF Gofton
Andrew Goodwin (2001): AJ Goodwin
Joe Greenhalgh (2001): JA Greenhalgh
Matthew Hall (2000–2001): MJ Hall
Dave Hallack (2002): D Hallack
Kevin Hollis (2000–2001): KJ Hollis
John Jordison (2001): JR Jordison
Rawait Khan (2000): RM Khan
Simon Lacey (2001): SJ Lacey
Chris Marples (1999–2000): C Marples
Adrian Marsh (1999–2001): AJ Marsh
Simon Moore (1999–2002): SO Moore
George Moulds (2001): GW Moulds
Naeem Akhtar (2002): Naeem Akhtar
Jonny Owen (2002): JEH Owen
Ian Parkin (1999–2002): IC Parkin
Pervez Iqbal (2000): Pervez Iqbal
Russell Sexton (2002): RJ Sexton
David Smit (1999–2002): D Smit
Ben Spendlove (2001): BL Spendlove
John Trueman (2002): JF Trueman
David Ward (1999–2000): DC Ward
Doug Watson (1999): DJ Watson

References

Derbyshire Cricket Board